Volodymyr Kravets  (3 May 1930, Uman Raion – 22 July 2011) was a Ukrainian diplomat who served as Permanent Representative of Ukraine to the United Nations and Minister of Foreign Affairs of the Ukrainian SSR.

Education 
Volodymyr Martynenko graduated from Taras Shevchenko National University of Kyiv (1953), University of Kharkiv (1956). Ph.D.

Professional career and experience 
In 1953-1954 - he was Instructor of the Kyiv City Committee of the Communist Party of Ukraine.
In 1956-1961 - he was Lecturer, Senior Lecturer, Department of Marxism–Leninism Kharkiv Aviation Institute, then Umansky Agricultural Institute.
In 1961-1965 - He worked as a consultant of the Department of Science and Culture of the Central Committee of the Communist Party.
In 1965-1967 - Senior Lecturer of Party History of the Kyiv National University of Construction and Architecture.
In 1967-1971 - he was Counsellor Minister of Foreign Affairs of the Ukrainian SSR.
In 1971-1979 - he was in office Deputy Minister of Foreign Affairs of the Ukrainian SSR.
In 1979-1984 - Permanent Representative of Ukraine to the United Nations.
From 29 December 1984 - 27 July 1990 - Minister of Foreign Affairs of the Ukrainian SSR.

He Participated in the 2 th, 23rd, 24th, 36th and 39th session of the General Assembly of the United Nations; headed the delegation of the Ukrainian SSR on 40-44th session of the UN on 6th, 8th and 9th Emergency Special Session, 3rd Special Session on Disarmament and the 14th Special Session of the UN General of the Namibian problem; In 1985, several presided over the meetings of the Security Council of the United Nations.

Diplomatic rank 
 Ambassador Extraordinary and Plenipotentiary

References

External links 
 Volodymyr Olelcsiyovych KRAVETS
 UNITED NATIONS SECURITY COUNCIL OFFICIAL RECORDS THIRTY-NINTH YEAR 2542nd MEETING: 25 MAY 1984 NEW YORK
 Anatoly Maksimovic, Mr. First Minister of independent Ukraine
 Diplomacy in the Former Soviet Republics James P. Nichol Greenwood Publishing Group, 1.01.1995 - 244.
 The Ukrainian Weekly 1989-24
 Soroka D. I. Historical retrospective of Ukraine's cooperation with the United Nations

1930 births
2011 deaths
People from Cherkasy Oblast
Soviet foreign ministers of Ukraine
Permanent Representatives of Ukraine to the United Nations
20th-century Ukrainian historians
Eleventh convocation members of the Verkhovna Rada of the Ukrainian Soviet Socialist Republic
20th-century Ukrainian politicians